Andrés Felipe Ibargüen García (born 7 May 1992) is a Colombian professional footballer who plays as a winger for Categoría Primera A club Independiente Medellín.

Club career
On 5 January 2018, Ibargüen signed for Liga MX side Club América on a 4 million dollar transaction. His debut occurred on 21 January 2018 in a match against Pumas UNAM that ended in a 0–0 draw. He scored his first goal on 6 March 2018 in a match against Tauro FC that ended in a 4–0 win in the quarterfinal stages of the CONCACAF Champions League.

Statistics

Club performance

Statistics accurate as of last match played on 26 November 2016.

1 Includes cup competitions such as Copa Libertadores and Copa Sudamericana.

2 Includes Superliga Colombiana matches.

Honours 
Atlético Nacional
 Superliga Colombiana (1): 2016
 Copa Libertadores (1): 2016
 Recopa Sudamericana: 2017

Deportes Tolima
 Copa Colombia (1): 2014

América
Liga MX: Apertura 2018
Copa MX: Clausura 2019
Campeón de Campeones: 2019

References

External links 
 

1992 births
Living people
Colombian footballers
Colombia international footballers
Colombian expatriate footballers
Categoría Primera A players
Argentine Primera División players
Liga MX players
Atlético Nacional footballers
Cortuluá footballers
Bogotá FC footballers
Deportes Tolima footballers
Club América footballers
Racing Club de Avellaneda footballers
Expatriate footballers in Argentina
Expatriate footballers in Mexico
Colombian expatriate sportspeople in Argentina
Colombian expatriate sportspeople in Mexico
Footballers from Cali
Association football forwards